Denchukha Gewog, also Duenchukha, is a gewog (village block) of Samtse District, Bhutan. 

Denchukha Gewog is part of Dorokha   Dungkhag (sub-district), together with Dorokha and Dungtoe Gewogs. The former Myona gewog was dissolved and areas abutting Haa were merged with Haa dzongkhag and rest of the areas were merged into Denchukha gewog. Denchukha Gewong is connected with roads and electricity.

Geography 
Denchukha is rich in biodiversity. 
Denchukha is almost five hours drive from Samtse. 

The Amo Chhu river makes it extremely difficult for motor vehicles to cross. During winter a temporary suspension bridge is available, however few vehicles dare to cross it. During summer, no vehicles cross the river. Few vehicles are on the other side. The ongoing Amo Chhu bridge construction that was intended to link the gewog with Dorokha (sub-district) collapsed on July, 2016 leading to many deaths.

Education 
Denchukha has a lower secondary school called Denchukha Lower Secondary School. 
Community schools operate in the villages under Denchkha Gewog.  NFE (Non-formal Education) centers are available to teach those not of school age, such as elderly farmers who did not go to school.

References 

Former gewogs of Bhutan
Samtse District